The Sony α7 II (model ILCE-7M2) is a full-frame mirrorless interchangeable-lens camera announced by Sony on 20 November 2014.

Model differences

See also
List of Sony E-mount cameras
List of Sony E-mount lenses
Sony α6500
Sony α7 III
Sony α9

References

External links

α7 II
Cameras introduced in 2015
Full-frame mirrorless interchangeable lens cameras